is a railway station on the AbukumaExpress in the city of Kakuda, Miyagi Prefecture, Japan.

Lines

Station layout
Yokokura Station has one side platform serving a single bi-directional track. The station is unattended.

Adjacent stations

History
Yokokura Station opened with the start of operations of the Abukuma Express on July 1, 1986.

Surrounding area
The station is located in a rural area with few buildings nearby.
 Japan National Route 113
 Japan National Route 349

See also
 List of Railway Stations in Japan

External links

  

Railway stations in Miyagi Prefecture
Abukuma Express Line
Railway stations in Japan opened in 1986
Railway stations in Japan opened in 1968
Kakuda, Miyagi